Stephen "Fane" Hihetah (born 23 September 1991), is an English born Romanian rugby union player who plays as a winger for National League 2 North club Hull RUFC and the Romania national rugby 7`s team.

Born in London Borough of Brent, England to a Romanian mother and Ghanaian father, Hihetah made his debut for Romania on 16 June 2013 against Italy A, in a 26-13 win that decided the 2013 IRB Nations Cup title.  He holds dual nationality with Romania and England.

In December 2019, he was banned from all sport for four years – from 12 June 2019 until 11 June 2023 after failing a drugs test. Hihetah was initially charged with a breach of World Rugby regulation 21.2.1: “Presence of a prohibited substance or its metabolites or markers in a player’s sample.”. Hihetah provided a urine sample following a training session on 21 February 2019, which were positive for the prohibited substances Stanozolol metabolites, Metandienone metabolite and Tamoxifen metabolite.

References

External links
Player Profile

1991 births
Living people
Doping cases in rugby union
English rugby union players
Ghanaian people of Romanian descent
Romanian rugby union players
Romania international rugby union players
Rugby union wings
Romanian people of Ghanaian descent
Rugby union players from London Borough of Brent